= Aaron Santcroos =

Dutch Jewish engraver

Aaron Santcroos (also Sanctroos) was a Dutch Jewish engraver who worked in Amsterdam, between 1752 and 1765. According to Marvin J. Heller, Santcroos's Hebrew name was Aaron ben Israel (his Dutch name means "holy cross"), but "the family, having forgotten its original Jewish name, simply referred to itself as Israel". He is responsible for the frontispiece of the Proops Talmud, produced in Amsterdam between 1752 and 1765 and printed by Joseph and Jacob Proops.
